Tom Williams (born 2 April 1991) is a Welsh rugby union player. A full-back or wing, he plays for Jersey Reds in the English RFU Championship having previously played for Scarlets and Cardiff Blues. His older brother Lloyd Williams is a Wales international rugby union player and his father is former Wales international scrum-half Brynmor Williams.

Williams began his career with Cardiff RFC, making his debut against Aberavon in 2010. Two years later, he made his Cardiff Blues debut against Newport Gwent Dragons. After 3 years with the region, he moved on loan to Scarlets. On 3 May 2016, it was announced that Williams had signed a two-year contract with the Scarlets

He was selected in the Wales Sevens squad for 2012-13

References

External links
 Cardiff RFC profile

Welsh rugby union players
Cardiff RFC players
Cardiff Rugby players
Scarlets players
1991 births
Living people
Rugby union players from Bridgend
Rugby union wings